Kennedy Ofong Ubenga (born 3 August 1981), known as Keny, is an Equatoguinean futsal player who plays for Manzanares as a winger and the Equatorial Guinea national futsal team. He also holds Spanish citizenship.

He is also the cousin of former footballer and current football scout Ben Manga.

International goals
Scores and results list Equatorial Guinea's goal tally first

Honors and awards

Clubs
Baku United
FA National Futsal League: 2014–15

References

External links
Keny at World One Sports Management

1981 births
Living people
Sportspeople from Malabo
Equatoguinean men's futsal players
Futsal forwards
Futsal defenders
Caja Segovia FS players
AD Sala 10 players
Baku United FC players
Equatoguinean expatriate sportspeople in Romania
Equatoguinean expatriate sportspeople in England
Equatoguinean expatriate sportspeople in Kuwait
Equatoguinean expatriate sportspeople in Japan
Equatoguinean expatriate sportspeople in France
Equatoguinean emigrants to Spain
Naturalised citizens of Spain